Neoclassical or neo-classical may refer to:

 Neoclassicism or New Classicism, any of a number of movements in the fine arts, literature, theatre, music, language, and architecture beginning in the 17th century
 Neoclassical architecture, an architectural style of the 18th and 19th centuries
 Neoclassical sculpture, a sculptural style of the 18th and 19th centuries
 New Classical architecture, an overarching movement of contemporary classical architecture in the 21st century
 in linguistics, a word that is a recent construction from New Latin based on older, classical elements
 Neoclassical ballet, a ballet style which uses traditional ballet vocabulary, but is generally more expansive than the classical structure allowed
 The "Neo-classical period" of painter Pablo Picasso immediately following World War I
 Neoclassical economics, a general approach in economics focusing on the determination of prices, outputs, and income distributions in markets through supply and demand
 Neoclassical realism, theory in international relations
 Neo-classical school (criminology), a school in criminology that continues the traditions of the Classical School within the framework of Right Realism
 Neo-classical theology, another name for process theology, a school of thought influenced by the metaphysical process philosophy of Alfred North Whitehead 
 Neoclassical transport is an effect seen in magnetic fusion energy reactors

Music
 Neoclassicism (music), a musical movement of the 20th century particularly popular in the period between the two World Wars
 Neoclassical dark wave, a genre of darkwave music
 Neoclassical metal, a subgenre of heavy metal music influenced by classical music
 Neoclassical new-age music, a subgenre of new age music

See also
 Neoclassic (automobile), a car that is made somewhat in the image of the classic cars of the 1920s and 1930s